The 2022 Berlin Thunder season is the second season of the Berlin Thunder team in the European League of Football.

Preseason
The Berlin Thunder started to resign their players on October 21, 2021 for the 2022 ELF season with the signing of leading rusher Joc Crawford. For this season the Berlin franchise introduced the league wide first season tickets for their home games. In an episode of their own published podcast, the director of football operations Björn Werner confirmed to not hold any form of combine for the 2022 season

Regular season

Standings

Schedule
 
Source: europeanleague.football

Roster

Transactions
From Leipzig Kings: Kyle Kitchens (November 12, 2021)

Staff

Notes

References 

Berlin Thunder (ELF)
Berlin Thunder
Berlin Thunder